Lists of cross-dressers cover people who cross-dress. They include people who cross-dress during wartime so they can serve or avoid service in the armed forces, exóticos, drag queens and drag kings.

Lists
List of wartime cross-dressers
List of exóticos
List of drag kings
List of drag queens
List of RuPaul's Drag Race contestants
List of cross-dressing characters in animated series

See also
 List of drag groups
 List of androgynous people
 List of transgender people
 Drag (clothing)
 Cross-dressing in film and television